Walter Malmquist (born 3 March 1956) is an American former Nordic combined skier and ski jumper who competed in the 1976 Winter Olympics and in the 1980 Winter Olympics.

References

1956 births
Living people
American male Nordic combined skiers
American male ski jumpers
Olympic Nordic combined skiers of the United States
Olympic ski jumpers of the United States
Nordic combined skiers at the 1976 Winter Olympics
Nordic combined skiers at the 1980 Winter Olympics
Ski jumpers at the 1980 Winter Olympics
Sportspeople from Vermont
People from Bradford, Vermont